Lu Jing (250–280), courtesy name Shiren, was a Chinese military general and writer of the state of Eastern Wu during the Three Kingdoms period of China. He was the second son of Lu Kang and a grandson of Lu Xun.

Life
Lu Jing's mother was Zhang Cheng's daughter. He married Sun He's daughter, who was born to another daughter of Zhang Cheng. Hence, both Lu Jing and his wife were Zhang Cheng's maternal grandchildren. Lu Jing's mother was also related to Zhuge Ke. She was sent into exile after Zhuge Ke and his clan were exterminated in a coup in 253. Lu Jing was raised by his grandmother, whom he mourned for three years when she died. Lu Jing served as a Cavalry Commandant (騎都尉) and received the title "Marquis of Piling" (毗陵侯). He was later promoted to Lieutenant-General (偏將軍) and served as the Commandant (督) of Zhongxia (中夏). Lu Jing was known to be studious and he wrote over 10 volumes of a book. He was killed in action during the Jin conquest of Wu in 280 along with his elder brother Lu Yan (陸晏). He was 31 years old (by East Asian age reckoning) at the time of his death.

See also
 Lists of people of the Three Kingdoms

References

 Chen, Shou (3rd century). Records of the Three Kingdoms (Sanguozhi).
 Pei, Songzhi (5th century). Annotations to Records of the Three Kingdoms (Sanguozhi zhu).

250 births
280 deaths
Eastern Wu generals
Three Kingdoms people killed in battle